The glass bloodfin tetra, Prionobrama filigera, is a species of Characid fish native to the Amazon River basin of South America.

Nutrition 
In the wild this fish eats mainly aquatic insect larvae and crustaceans.
In an aquarium they will readily adapt to a diet of commercial dry fish foods, but benefit from a variety of food including both live and frozen foods such as daphnia and bloodworms.

Aquarium care 
The glass bloodfin tetra is a community tank fish that would do best in a group of at least 8 fish. A well planted aquarium with a volume of 15 Gallons (57 L) would make an ideal home for this species.

Breeding 
Prionobrama filigera will breed successfully in harder and more alkaline water than most tetra species.  A pH of 7.3 and 10 degrees of hardness is suitable, but not the much harder water the adults can live in.
It is an egg scattering species that will eat its own eggs.

References 
 http://www.fishbase.org/Summary/SpeciesSummary.php?id=12396
 http://www.bettatrading.com.au/Glass-Bloodfin-Tetra-Fact-Sheet.php
 http://www.fishchannel.com/freshwater-aquariums/species-info/keeping-and-breeding-the-glass-bloodfin.aspx

Tetras
Freshwater fish of Brazil
Freshwater fish of Colombia
Freshwater fish of Ecuador
Freshwater fish of Peru
Fish of the Amazon basin
Fish described in 1870